Fallou is a village and rural commune in the Cercle of Nara in the Koulikoro Region of south-western Mali. The commune contains 43 villages and in the 2009 census had a population of 30,239.

References

External links
.

Communes of Koulikoro Region